The Golden Joystick Award for Game of the Year is an award presented annually at the Golden Joystick Awards ceremony, which has its winners voted in by the British general public. The award is given in honor to the best video game released in a particular year. The first Golden Joystick Awards were held in 1983, with the Ultimate Play the Game–developed shooter Jetpac winning Game of the Year.

The award was initially given to 8-bit computer games, as 8-bit microcomputers were the most popular home video game platforms in the UK market for much of the 1980s. Following the rise of 16-bit home computers and 8-bit game consoles in the late 1980s, they began awarding separate Game of the Year awards for 8-bit computers, 16-bit computers and game consoles from 1989. From 1991, they began awarding a single Game of the Year award for all platforms.

The award was originally given under the Game of the Year name and held this name from the original 1983 ceremony to the 2002 ceremony, with the exception of the 1991/1992 ceremonies, and later again in 2013 and 2014. From 1988 to 1990, the Golden Joystick Awards handed out several Game of the Year awards, for an 8-bit computer game, 16-bit computer game, and console game. During the 1991 ceremony, the award was presented as the Overall Game of the Year (including all systems), in order to distinguish it from another category (16-Bit Game of the Year, specifically for 16-bit computers), before switching back for the 1992/93 ceremony. In 1996/97, the top award was once again given under the Game of the Year name. However, the Golden Joystick Awards were put on hiatus until 2002. Returning for one year under its original name, the award was then presented as the Ultimate Game of the Year for the 2003 ceremony, a moniker it held until 2012, and then again from 2015 onwards.

Winners

References

Awards established in 1983
Awards for best video game
 
Video game lists by reception or rating